WMRN (1490 kHz) is a commercial AM radio station  broadcasting a talk radio format. It is licensed to Marion, Ohio, ("MRN" stands for Marion Radio News) and is owned by iHeartMedia, Inc., through licensee iHM Licenses, LLC.  It features programming from Fox News Radio and Premiere Networks.

History
WMRN signed on the air on December 23, 1940. It was the first radio station to broadcast from Marion. In its early years, it was an affiliate of the ABC Radio Network, carrying its dramas, comedies, news, and sports during the "Golden Age of Radio."

In May 1953, WMRN's owners launched an FM sister station, 106.9 WMRN-FM, initially operating as a simulcast of the AM station. In the 1960s, it switched to automated beautiful music until its format was flipped to country music on April 1, 1981. It moved to 94.3 MHz in 2008. 

When network programming shifted from radio to television in the 1950s, WMRN 1490 switched to a full-service, middle of the road format of popular adult music, news, and sports, branding itself "Hometown Radio 1490." Over time, talk shows were added and music programming was removed. By the late 1980s, WMRN's weekday schedule consisted largely of locally-produced talk shows accompanied by the nationally syndicated The Rush Limbaugh Show, with the last vestiges of its non-religious music schedule, largely consisting of weekend oldies programming, removed by 1999. 

WMRN-AM-FM were acquired by Jacor Communications in the 1990s, which later merged into Clear Channel Communications, the forerunner to today's iHeartMedia. Under Clear Channel's ownership, WMRN's traditional full-service/hometown format featuring a variety of locally-produced content was phased out, as syndicated talk programming began filling the station's afternoon and evening weekday schedule. Since the June 2019 retirement of longtime local morning host Jeff Ruth, WMRN airs no locally-produced weekday programming, except for local newscasts.

Current programming
All programming is syndicated from co-owned Premiere Networks and aired live unless otherwise noted. National news updates from Fox News Radio air at the beginning of each hour. Local newscasts are heard at the bottom of each hour and following Fox News, a few minutes past each hour on weekdays.

Weekdays
 This Morning, America's First News with Gordon Deal, 5:00 a.m.–9:00 a.m. (Compass Media Networks)
 The Glenn Beck Radio Program, 9:00 a.m.–12:00 p.m.
 The Clay Travis and Buck Sexton Show, 12:00 p.m.–3:00 p.m.
 The Sean Hannity Show, 3:00 p.m.–6:00 p.m.
 The Jesse Kelly Show, 6:00 p.m.–9:00 p.m.
 The Joe Pags Show, 9:00 p.m.–12:00 a.m. (tape delayed; Compass Media Networks)
 Coast to Coast AM with George Noory, 12:00 a.m.–5:00 a.m. (till 6:00 a.m. on Saturdays)

Saturday
 In the Garden with Ron Wilson, 6:00 a.m.–9:00 a.m. 
 At Home with Gary Sullivan, 9:00 a.m.–12:00 p.m.
 The Weekend with Michael Brown, 12:00 p.m.–3:00 p.m.
 Leo Laporte – The Tech Guy, 3:00 p.m.–6:00 p.m.
 Bill Handel on the Law, 6:00 p.m.–9:00 p.m.
 Somewhere in Time with Art Bell, 9:00 p.m.–1:00 a.m.
 Coast to Coast AM, 1:00 a.m.–6:00 a.m.

Sunday
 Contemporary Christian music, 6:00 a.m.–8:00 a.m. (local)
 Newscenter at Large local public affairs programming, 8:00 a.m.–8:30 a.m. (local)
 Paul James, 8:30 a.m.–12:00 p.m. (local)
 At Home with Gary Sullivan, 12:00 p.m.–3:00 p.m. (replay)
 Leo Laporte – The Tech Guy, 3:00 p.m.–6:00 p.m. (replay)
 The Best of The Sean Hannity Show, 6:00 p.m.–9:00 p.m.
 iHeart Podcast Channel, 9:00 p.m.–10:00 p.m.
 Sunday Nights with Bill Cunningham, 10:00 p.m.–1:00 a.m.
 Coast to Coast AM, 1:00 a.m.–5:00 a.m.

Live sports programming
Note that live sports programming preempts the regularly-scheduled programming listed above on the terrestrial broadcast. Regularly-scheduled programming airs on the streamed broadcast due to blackout restrictions imposed by the National Football League, the National Hockey League, Major League Baseball, and the NCAA.

Fall
 Cincinnati Bengals football (NFL)
 Ohio State Buckeyes football (NCAA)
 Local high school football

Winter
 Columbus Blue Jackets hockey (NHL)
 Ohio State Buckeyes men's basketball (NCAA)
 Local high school basketball

Spring/Summer
 Cleveland Guardians baseball (MLB)

Former programming

Syndicated
 The Rush Limbaugh Show
 The Jim Bohannon Show
 The Dr. Laura Program
 Rock & Roll's Greatest Hits with Dick Bartley
 Fox Sports Radio  programming

Local
 The Morning Show with Charlie Evers (1968–1996); Jeff Ruth (1996–2019)
 Tradio
 Morning Magazine
 The WMRN News Hour
 Sunday worship services from Trinity United Methodist Church, Marion, and Evangelical Lutheran Church, Marion

Additional local programming aired throughout WMRN's history during its time operating under a full-service format prior to its shift to mostly syndicated programming by 2019.

References

External links

MRN
IHeartMedia radio stations
News and talk radio stations in the United States